Trypogeus aureopubens is a species of beetle in the family Cerambycidae. It was described by Pic in 1903.

References

Dorcasominae
Beetles described in 1903